Juan Ramón Martinez (born 1941 in Olanchito) is a Honduran writer, columnist, analyst and former politician. He was a presidential candidate for the 2005 general elections, representing the Christian Democratic Party of Honduras. Currently he is a columnist in the newspaper La Tribuna.

He received the Ramón Rosa National Literature Award in 2016.

References

Christian Science Monitor article on Martinez

1941 births
Living people
People from Yoro Department
Christian Democratic Party of Honduras politicians
Honduran male writers
Honduran columnists